Alwyn Davey (born 15 May 1984) is a former Australian rules footballer who played for the Essendon Football Club of the Australian Football League (AFL) between 2007 and 2013.

Early life
Davey is of Indigenous Australian descent with tribal ancestry that can be traced to the Kokatha people in South Australia  Alwyn was born to mother Lizzie, named after father Alwyn Davey and raised in Darwin, Northern Territory.

Davey played his junior football in Darwin.  His father died when he was eight years old.

Davey moved to Adelaide to play football semi-professionally with South Adelaide in the South Australian National Football League (SANFL).

Davey first attracted the attention of AFL talent scouts after the impressive first and second seasons of his brother Aaron for the Melbourne Football Club.

In the 2006 pre-season, Alwyn was invited to train with his brother at Melbourne, and many believed that the club would take a chance on him. The Demons already had a crumbing forward in Aaron and many clubs were averse to drafting short players.  Furthermore, by the time of the draft, Alwyn had turned 22.  Most draftees are taken at just 18, making him considered old for the national draft.  Most therefore had picked Alwyn Davey to be taken by Melbourne as with a rookie selection.

Essendon coach Kevin Sheedy had become particularly interested in the progress of Aaron Davey and since the success of Andrew Lovett, fast indigenous players in general. Davey was drafted by the Bombers in the 3rd round of the 2006 AFL Draft.

Career

2007
Davey made his AFL debut in the opening round of the 2007 season, making an immediate impression and played in every game until Round 14.

He has featured several times amongst the Bombers' best including an outstanding ANZAC Day match. In his first 5 AFL matches he got an incredible 5 goal of the year nominations including 2 on ANZAC Day.

Davey became known for his explosive speed. He has been known to take 2.75 secs to run from 0–20 metres.  This is thought to be the fastest in the league, even more than speedster Chris Judd.  From debut, Davey became one of the shortest players in the AFL.

He quickly earned a cult following at Essendon, gaining the nickname is "Froggy", due to his appearance.

During the round 14 game against Geelong, he suffered a broken arm when crashed into while on the ground by Kane Tenace. The injury forced Davey to miss the rest of the season, and Essendon's form slumped during the period that he was on the sidelines, eventually missing the finals.

At the end of the 2007 AFL season, Alwyn won the AFL Army Award, recognising players who produce act(s) of bravery or selflessness to promote the cause of his team, during a game for his smother and 2nd and 3rd efforts against Hawthorn in round 6. He had 3 of the final 6 nominations in the award.

2008
While running at training after round Four in 2008, Davey twisted and injured his right knee when changing direction, requiring immediate surgery and making him unavailable for the rest of the season because this would require him to miss between 6 and 12 months. Despite the injury, Davey continued to train but coach Matthew Knights did not risk him.

2009
In 2009, his defensive pressure in the forward line has been a welcome return to the Essendon squad, currently leading the tackle count.

2013
In 2013, Essendon Football Club announced that Alwyn Davey would not be offered a contract for the 2014 AFL season.

Personal life
Alwyn and Aaron Davey are cousins of Brownlow medallist Gavin Wanganeen. Alwyn was named after his father.

Statistics

|- style="background-color: #EAEAEA"
! scope="row" style="text-align:center" | 2007
|  || 29 || 14 || 15 || 10 || 94 || 67 || 161 || 46 || 54 || 1.1 || 0.7 || 6.7 || 4.8 || 11.5 || 3.3 || 3.9 || 2
|- 
! scope="row" style="text-align:center" | 2008
|  || 29 || 5 || 5 || 1 || 33 || 38 || 71 || 10 || 23 || 1.0 || 0.2 || 6.6 || 7.6 || 14.2 || 2.0 || 4.6 || 0
|- style="background-color: #EAEAEA" 
! scope="row" style="text-align:center" | 2009
|  || 29 || 20 || 14 || 13 || 141 || 131 || 272 || 48 || 87 || 0.7 || 0.6 || 7.0 || 6.6 || 13.6 || 2.4 || 4.4 || 1
|-
! scope="row" style="text-align:center" | 2010
|  || 29 || 16 || 22 || 14 || 104 || 103 || 207 || 34 || 86 || 1.4 || 0.9 || 6.5 || 6.4 || 12.9 || 2.1 || 5.4 || 0
|- style="background-color: #EAEAEA" 
! scope="row" style="text-align:center" | 2011
|  || 29 || 14 || 16 || 8 || 74 || 68 || 142 || 29 || 63 || 1.1 || 0.6 || 5.3 || 4.9 || 10.1 || 2.1 || 4.5 || 0
|-
! scope="row" style="text-align:center" | 2012
|  || 29 || 17 || 29 || 21 || 121 || 79 || 200 || 33 || 66 || 1.7 || 1.2 || 7.1 || 4.6 || 11.8 || 1.9 || 3.9 || 0
|- style="background-color: #EAEAEA" 
! scope="row" style="text-align:center" | 2013
|  || 29 || 14 || 19 || 12 || 78 || 55 || 133 || 25 || 46 || 1.4 || 0.9 || 5.6 || 3.9 || 9.5 || 1.8 || 3.3 || 0
|- class="sortbottom"
! colspan=3| Career
! 100
! 120
! 79
! 645
! 541
! 1186
! 225
! 425
! 1.2
! 0.8
! 6.5
! 5.4
! 11.9
! 2.3
! 4.3
! 3
|}

References

External links

Essendon Football Club players
1984 births
Living people
Indigenous Australian players of Australian rules football
South Adelaide Football Club players
Sportspeople from Darwin, Northern Territory
Australian rules footballers from the Northern Territory
Northern Territory Football Club players
Palmerston Football Club players
Bendigo Football Club players
Australia international rules football team players